Atelopus senex (common name: pass stubfoot toad) is an extinct species of toad in the family Bufonidae. It was endemic to Costa Rica and known from the Cordillera Central and Cordillera de Talamanca at elevations of  asl.

Description
Males measure  and females  in snout–vent length. Males are bluish gray, blue-green, black, or occasionally greenish, without patterning. Females may have patterning consisting of cream, lemon, or lime-coloured lighter areas.

Habitat and conservation
Its natural habitats are stream margins in premontane and lower montane rainforests. It was formerly abundant but has seen a drastic population decline. Last seen in 1986, it might already be extinct. Its decline is likely to have been caused by chytridiomycosis, although climate change, pet trade, and pollution are also possible threats.

References

senex
Amphibians of Costa Rica
Endemic fauna of Costa Rica
Amphibians described in 1952
Taxonomy articles created by Polbot